A destructive series of four tornadoes hit the Southeastern United States during March 3-4, 1966. The worst event was a violent and long-lived F5 tornado, dubbed the Candlestick Park tornado after the name of a recently-opened Jackson, Mississippi shopping center which was leveled by the storm; possibly at least in part subconsciously because of the irony of a place named after what was once the only source of light in darkness for many having had, so to speak, seemingly all of it brutally snuffed out so quickly. The storm would bring catastrophic damage in Mississippi and Alabama along a  track. The outbreak killed 58, injured 521, and caused $75.552 million in damage.

Meteorological synopsis
On Thursday, March 3, 1966, the atmosphere over Mississippi was ripe for a violent tornado. A large mid-level trough, centered near Sioux Falls, South Dakota, was the overall system that produced the tornado. It featured low millibar heights roughly four times below the standard mean. Additionally, an unusually strong mid-level jet stream with  winds provided additional energy to the storm system. The final factor in the development of the Candlestick Park storm was a subtle wind shift near the surface. At the higher levels, winds flowed from the southwest to the northeast in relation to the jet stream; however, closer to the surface, the inflow from the low pressure system over South Dakota resulted in a south to north flow, allowing for rotation within storms.

In the hours prior to the tornado forming, convective available potential energy (CAPE) values of over 1500 J/kg were present, indicating moderate instability. However, dry air at higher levels created a capping inversion, limiting the number of thunderstorms that could develop. Later on, a warm front moved past Jackson, Mississippi, allowing more moist air into the region and increasing lapse rates. While this cap served to prevent a widespread tornado outbreak, it did allow for the formation of a few discrete strong storms. With this, a supercell thunderstorm developed over Louisiana and produced three tornadoes, including the large F5 tornado that moved through Mississippi and Alabama.

Confirmed tornadoes

Candlestick Park tornado

This violent F5 tornado, which may have been a tornado family, first touched down south of Learned, Mississippi around 4:00 pm CST. Tracking generally to the northeast, the tornado moved through mostly rural areas south of Raymond though several barns and a few homes were heavily damaged. The tornado also toppled the 1,900 foot broadcast tower for Jackson television station WLBT. Around 4:30 pm CST, the storm struck the southern limits of Jackson as an F4 or F5 tornado and mostly leveled the Candlestick Park shopping center. Cinder-blocks from the structure were scattered for long distances. A number of homes and businesses were also destroyed in this area. Many homes and businesses in the area were completely destroyed by the tornado, including a glass factory that was severely mangled. A brick Baptist church was destroyed with such force that it seemingly "exploded".

Once it moved through Jackson, the storm crossed the Pearl River and entered Rankin County. In Rankin County, the tornado's progress became unclear as it passed through mostly rural areas and an industrial complex. Currently, it is believed to have continued a nearly straight northeastward track through the entire county. However, reports from locals indicate that the tornado turned slightly more northward.

Near the Leesburg community, the tornado reached its maximum strength of F5, where multiple homes were swept away, large swaths of trees were leveled, pavement was scoured, and chicken houses were obliterated. Similar damage took place as the system moved into Scott County, though specifics are scarce for this portion of the storm's history. Crossing into Leake County along MS 35, the tornado took a more northeasterly track, passing near the communities of Madden and Salem. In Neshoba County, the storm began to weaken and may have lifted several times as it moved through both the Neshoba and Kemper counties. Despite this, about a dozen more homes were destroyed before the tornado crossed into Alabama. After crossing the border, significant damage continued through Pickens and Tuscaloosa Counties before the tornado finally dissipated near the city of Tuscaloosa around 7:45 p.m. CST.

Impact

Throughout Mississippi, damage from the tornado amounted to $75 million (1966 USD) ($ ( USD)). The most severe damage took place at the Candlestick Park shopping center in southern Jackson where 12 people were killed. Much of the building was leveled and only one wall remained standing.

Historic perspective
 
Prior to the Candlestick Park tornado, there had only been one other F5 (the other occurring on December 5, 1953) to touch down in Mississippi. The next storm of this intensity would not take place until April 27, 2011, when two EF5 tornadoes touched down near the towns of Philadelphia and Smithville.  Overall, the tornado ranks as the second-deadliest and longest-tracked in the state's history, having killed 57 and traveled ; however, excluding outside portions of the track, it ranks third. In general, it is also regarded as one of the most devastating tornadoes to ever strike Mississippi.

In the decades following the tornado, reassessments on the history of the storm have been made; most notably the Jackson, Mississippi branch of the National Weather Service and meteorologist Thomas P. Grazulis both indicate that there were two separate tornadoes. Based on reports from residents who experienced the tornado, a second one formed as the original dissipated, a common occurrence in cycling supercell thunderstorms. Though there is agreement on this feature, the results have not been implemented into the National Climatic Data Center's severe weather database, thus it is still officially considered one tornado. According to the study by Grazulis, the tornado dissipated over Leake County and a second tornado, estimated at F2 strength, touched down in Pickens County, Alabama.

On the 50th anniversary of the tornado, the National Weather Service in Jackson published a section on the tornado titled "If the Tornado Happened Today," briefly detailing the scale of damage in relation to new development just to the east of Jackson in the communities of Pearl and Flowood. Given exactly the same path that took place in 1966, the loss of life would be considerably higher. Striking at rush hour, numerous vehicles would be in the path of the tornado as it crossed Interstates 20 and 55 as well as US 80 and MS 25. Despite vastly improved warning systems, the population density of Jackson's eastern suburbs would lean towards a higher likelihood of fatalities.

See also
List of F5 and EF5 tornadoes
List of North American tornadoes and tornado outbreaks

Notes

References
General

Specific

F5 tornadoes
Tornadoes of 1966
Tornadoes in the United States
Tornadoes in Louisiana
Tornadoes in Mississippi
Tornadoes in Alabama
Tornadoes in North Carolina
1966 natural disasters in the United States
March 1966 events in the United States